The Stoic is a novel by Theodore Dreiser, written in 1945 and first published in 1947. It is the conclusion of his Trilogy of Desire, which includes The Financier (1912) and The Titan (1914). This series of novels depicts Frank Cowperwood, a businessman based on the real-life streetcar tycoon Charles Yerkes. Dreiser had attempted to complete his trilogy in the early 1930s, but he was unable to begin The Stoic until near the end of his life; he died before he could finish the manuscript, and his widow Helen assembled the novel's final pages.

Plot summary
Cowperwood, still married to his estranged wife Aileen, lives with Berenice. He decides to move to London, England, where he intends to take over and develop the underground railway system. Berenice becomes close to Earl Stane, while Frank has an affair with Lorna Maris, a relative of his. Meanwhile, he tries to fix Aileen up with Tollifer, but she becomes enraged when she finds out it was a ruse. Finally, Cowperwood dies of Bright's disease. His inheritance is squandered in lawsuits. Aileen dies shortly after. Berenice travels to India, where she is moved by poverty. Back in the United States, she realises there is poverty there too, and decides to set up a hospital for the poor, as Cowperwood intended.

Cultural allusions
Cowperwood is said to own paintings by William-Adolphe Bouguereau, Jean-Baptiste-Camille Corot, Rembrandt, Meindert Hobbema, Teniers, Jacob Isaakszoon van Ruisdael, Hans Holbein the Younger, Peter Paul Rubens, Anthony van Dyck, Reynolds, and J. M. W. Turner, among others.

References

Novels by Theodore Dreiser
1947 American novels
Novels published posthumously
Doubleday (publisher) books